Jonathan Austin (born October 6, 1984) is an American cinematographer.

Career 
Austin began his career as a news photographer in 2003 with NBC News WHAG before moving into cinematography and film producing work for a wide range of production companies in 2006 (New York). His work has been featured in several independent feature films, national television commercials, not-profit ad campaigns and documentary films.

In 2008 Austin started working with CTV National News in their Washington Bureau as a national and international news photographer and editor.

Austin is also known for his work on Koran Dunbar's film Greencastle (2011) and JP Azais' film The Wind Blows (2010).

Filmography

References 

hagerstownmagazine.com
therecordherald.com
articles.herald-mail.com
greencastlethefilm.com

External links 
 

American cinematographers
Living people
1984 births
Place of birth missing (living people)